Houlka Creek is a stream in the U.S. state of Mississippi. It is a tributary to Chuquatonchee Creek.

Houlka is a name derived from the Choctaw language purported to mean "calf of the leg". Variant names are "Holky Creek", "Hoolka Creek", "Hoolky Creek" and "Sheco Creek"

References

Rivers of Mississippi
Rivers of Chickasaw County, Mississippi
Rivers of Clay County, Mississippi
Rivers of Pontotoc County, Mississippi
Mississippi placenames of Native American origin